Christelle Petex-Levet (born 2 September 1980) is a French politician who has been Member of Parliament for Haute-Savoie's 3rd constituency since 2021.

Political career 
In Parliament she sat on the Sustainable Development, Spatial and Regional Planning Committee.

In the 2022 French legislative election, she narrowly avoided elimination in the first round. She won a landslide in the second round against the NUPES candidate.

See also 

 Women in the French National Assembly

References 

1980 births

Living people
The Republicans (France) politicians
People from Annecy
21st-century French politicians
21st-century French women politicians
Women mayors of places in France
Deputies of the 15th National Assembly of the French Fifth Republic
Women members of the National Assembly (France)
Members of Parliament for Haute-Savoie
Deputies of the 16th National Assembly of the French Fifth Republic